Eagle Flute is a 2009 Chinese film directed by Tao Jiang. 

The film concerns a young Chinese girl's adoption by a nomadic Tibetan family and her quest to find her birth parents. The film was screened at the 2009 Monaco Charity Film Festival, where it won the Special Jury Prize.

References

External links
 
 English-language poster
 

2009 films
Chinese drama films
Chinese-language films